Pat McDonagh (born 5 May 1957) is an Irish sportsman. He competed in rowing at the 1980 Summer Olympics and the 1988 Summer Olympics. He also competed in the bobsleigh at the 1992 Winter Olympics.

References

External links
 

1957 births
Living people
Irish male bobsledders
Irish male rowers
Olympic bobsledders of Ireland
Olympic rowers of Ireland
Bobsledders at the 1992 Winter Olympics
Rowers at the 1980 Summer Olympics
Rowers at the 1988 Summer Olympics
Place of birth missing (living people)
20th-century Irish people